The men's modern pentathlon multi-sport event at the 1960 Olympic Games took place on August 26–31.

Format

Riding: The riding event was held on August 26 at Passo Corese.  It was contested as an equestrian cross-country steeplechase.  Competitors are paired with horses in a random draw 20 minutes before the event.

Fencing: The fencing event was held on August 27 at the Palazzo dei Congressi. It was contested as a single touch épée round-robin tournament.

Shooting: The shooting event was held on August 28 at Umberto I Shooting Range. It was contested as 20 shot 10 metre air pistol.

Swimming: The swimming event was help on August 30 at the Swimming Stadium. It was contested as a 300 metre freestyle swim.

Running: The running event was held on August 31 at the Acqua Santa Golf Club Course. It was contested as a 4000 metre cross-country race.

Results

Final standings

Key: DNF = did not finish

References
1960 Summer Olympics results: men's modern pentathlon, from https://www.sports-reference.com/; retrieved 2010-08-22.

1960 in modern pentathlon
1960